Bergmans is a surname. Notable people with this surname include:

 Paul Bergmans (1868–1935), Belgian librarian
 Philippe Bergmans (born 1974), Belgian sailor
  (1940-2018), Dutch zoologist

See also
 Mats Bergmans, Swedish band
 Bergmann's rule
 Bergman